The Medal Winners Open is an invitational pro-am figure skating competition organized by the Japan Skating Federation and sanctioned by the International Skating Union (ISU). Medals are awarded in the disciplines of Men's and Ladies' singles. The invited skaters should have won a medal in a major ISU competition such as Olympics, Worlds, Europeans, 4CC, and Grand Prix Final.

Each skater performs an ISU free skating program in a modified format which emphasizes artistic merit. The program duration is 3 minutes and 30 seconds +/- 10 seconds for men and 3 minutes +/- 10 seconds for ladies. Three jump passes, three spins, and a choreographic sequence should be performed. One of the jump passes can be a two-jump combination or a sequence of jumps. Vocal music, theatrical lighting, and small props are allowed.

2017

In place of Medal Winners Open, the promoters presented Medal Winners Gala on January 14, 2017 in Yokohama, Japan.

2016
The third competition was held on January 15, 2016 in Osaka, Japan.

Men

Ladies

2015
The second competition was held on January 16, 2015 in Tokyo, Japan.

Men

Ladies

2012
The inaugural competition was held on October 5, 2012 in Saitama, Japan.

Men

Ladies

References

External links
 Results at GoldenSkate.com
 2012 competition official site
 2012 competition information at the International Skating Union
 2015 competition official site
 2015 competition information at the International Skating Union
 2016 competition official site
 2016 competition information at the International Skating Union

Figure skating competitions